José Alejandro Cañizares Gómez (born 9 January 1983) is a Spanish professional golfer who plays on the European Tour.

Career
Cañizares was born in Madrid, and is the son of five-time European Tour winner and four-time European Ryder Cup team member, José María Cañizares. He attended college in the United States, where he won the 2003 individual NCAA men's golf championship while at Arizona State University. He turned professional in 2006.

In August 2006, Cañizares won on his third start as an affiliate member of the European Tour, at the Imperial Collection Russian Open. The win gave him full membership of the tour for two years. It also put him into the record books as the fastest affiliate member to win on the tour, surpassing Sergio García and Graeme McDowell who had both won in their fourth tournaments.

Cañizares earned his PGA Tour card for 2008 through the 2007 PGA Tour Qualifying Tournament. He divided his time between both the PGA and European tours during the season, but was only able to retain his playing status in Europe.

In March 2014, Cañizares won his second European Tour title at the Trophée Hassan II tournament in Morocco. He shot a 62 in the first round and led wire-to-wire, culminating in a five-stroke victory to end an eight-year drought on the tour.

Amateur wins
2001 Copa Nacional Puerta de Hierro
2002 Spanish Amateur Under 21 Championship
2003 National Invitational, NCAA Championship
2004 ASU Thunderbird Invitational
2005 Big-10/Pac-10 Challenge, PING-Arizona Intercollegiate, Puerto Rico Classic

Professional wins (2)

European Tour wins (2)

European Tour playoff record (0–2)

Results in major championships

CUT = missed the half-way cut
"T" = tied

Team appearances
Amateur
European Boys' Team Championship (representing Spain): 2001
Jacques Léglise Trophy (representing Continental Europe): 2001 (winners)
European Youths' Team Championship (representing Spain): 2002, 2004
European Amateur Team Championship (representing Spain): 2003 (winners), 2005
Palmer Cup (representing Europe): 2003 (winners), 2004 (winners), 2005, 2006 (winners)

See also
2007 PGA Tour Qualifying School graduates
2009 European Tour Qualifying School graduates
2018 European Tour Qualifying School graduates
2019 European Tour Qualifying School graduates

References

External links

Spanish male golfers
Arizona State Sun Devils men's golfers
European Tour golfers
PGA Tour golfers
Golfers from Madrid
Sportspeople from Málaga
1983 births
Living people
20th-century Spanish people
21st-century Spanish people